Kings XI Punjab (KXIP) is a franchise cricket team based in Mohali, India, which plays in the Indian Premier League (IPL). They were one of the eight teams that competed in the 2009 Indian Premier League. They were captained by Kumar Sangakkara. Kings XI Punjab finished 5th in the IPL and did not qualify for the Champions League T20.

Indian Premier League

Season standings
Kings XI Punjab finished 5th in the league stage of IPL 2009.

Match log

References

2009 Indian Premier League
Punjab Kings seasons